Alwyn George Davies FRS (born 1926) is a British chemist, emeritus professor, and Fellow of University College London.

Life
He earned a B.Sc. from University College London in 1946, and Ph.D. in 1949, where he studied with Christopher Kelk Ingold.
He was a lecturer at Battersea Polytechnic, from 1949 to 1953.
He taught at University College London, 1953 to 1991.

Works
Organic Peroxides, Butterworths, 1961
; Wiley-VCH, 2004,

References

External links
https://web.archive.org/web/20121105220447/http://www.ucl.ac.uk/chemistry/staff/emeritus/alwyn_davies/research
https://web.archive.org/web/20120426041635/http://solarsaddle.wordpress.com/2011/01/22/william-ramsay-a-blue-plaque-9-february-2011/

1926 births
British chemists
Fellows of the Royal Society
Living people
Alumni of University College London
Academics of University College London
Place of birth missing (living people)